Bonomyces sinopicus is an agaricoid species of fungus in the family Biannulariaceae with a European districution. It has been given the recommended English name of spring funnel. The species was formerly placed in the genus Clitocybe, but has been separated on DNA characteristics.

References

Agaricales
Fungi of Europe
Fungi described in 1818
Taxa named by Elias Magnus Fries